Phyllonorycter ledella is a moth of the family Gracillariidae. It is known from Québec, Canada, and California, United States. The species is listed as endangered in Connecticut.

The wingspan is 9–10 mm.

The larvae feed on Rhododendron columbianum.  They mine the leaves of their host plant. The mine has the form of a blotch mine on the upperside of the leaf, sometimes covering the whole leaf area.

References

ledella
Moths of North America
Moths described in 1889